This is the complete filmography of actor Audrey Totter (December 20, 1917 – December 12, 2013). Originally a radio actress, she entered motion pictures in 1944 and became known for her portrayals of Femme fatales and hard-boiled dames. She is best remembered for her appearances in such features as Lady in the Lake (1947), The Unsuspected (1947), and The Set-Up (1949). She later found equal success in television with recurring roles on such syndicated sitcoms as Our Man Higgins, Cimarron City, Dr. Kildare, and Medical Center.

Filmography and TV appearances

1945: Main Street After Dark as Jessie Belle Dibson
1945: Dangerous Partners as Lili Roegan
1945: Bewitched as Karen (voice, uncredited)
1945: Ziegfeld Follies as Phone Operator ('Number Please') (voice, uncredited)
1945: The Hidden Eye as Perfume Saleslady (uncredited)
1945: Her Highness and the Bellboy as Mildred (uncredited)
1945: The Sailor Takes a Wife as Lisa Borescu
1945: Adventure as Ethel (uncredited)
1946: The Postman Always Rings Twice as Madge Gorland
1946: The Cockeyed Miracle as Jennifer Griggs
1946: Lady in the Lake as Adrienne Fromsett
1946: The Secret Heart as Dinner Party Guest (voice, uncredited)
1947: The Beginning or the End as Jean O'Leary
1947: The Unsuspected as Althea Keane
1947: High Wall as Dr. Ann Lorrison
1948: The Saxon Charm as Alma Wragg
1949: Alias Nick Beal as Donna Allen
1949: The Set-Up as Julie
1949: Any Number Can Play as Alice Elcott
1950: Tension as Claire Quimby
1951: The Blue Veil as Helen Williams
1951: F.B.I. Girl as Shirley Wayne
1952: The Sellout as Cleo Bethel
1952: Assignment: Paris as Sandy Tate
1952: My Pal Gus as Joyce Jennings
1953: Woman They Almost Lynched as Kate Quantrill
1953: Man in the Dark as Peg Benedict
1953: Cruisin' Down the River as Sally Jane Jackson
1953: Champ for a Day as Miss Peggy Gormley
1953: Mission Over Korea as Kate, Nurse-Lieutenant
1954: Four Star Playhouse (TV Series) as Lila Lamont
1954: Massacre Canyon as Flaxy
1954: The Whistler (TV Series) as Kay Fallon
1955: Women's Prison as Joan Burton
1955: A Bullet for Joey as Joyce Geary
1955: Science Fiction Theatre (TV Series) as Ellie Ferguson
1955: Fireside Theatre (TV Series)
1953–1955: The Ford Television Theatre (TV Series) as Breezy Adams / Joyce Evans
1955: The Vanishing American as Marion Warner
1956: Lux Video Theatre (TV Series) as Cheryl
1956: The 20th Century-Fox Hour (TV Series) as Ellen Benson
1956: Schlitz Playhouse (TV Series) as WAF Dietician
1956: Matinee Theatre (TV Series)
1956: Warner Brothers Presents (TV Series)
1956: Zane Grey Theater (TV Series) as Martha Phillips
1957: The Joseph Cotten Show (TV Series) as Ellen Parsons
1957: Ghost Diver as Anne Stevens
1957: The Californians (TV Series) as Dr. Louise Kendall
1958: Suspicion (TV Series) as Marie Farrell
1955–1958: Climax! (TV Series) as Anna Lederer / Dr. Helen Koenig / Edna Shaddick
1958: Cheyenne (TV Series) as Martha Fullerton
1958: Jet Attack as Tanya Nikova
1958: Man or Gun as Fran Dare
1958: Wagon Train (TV Series) as Goldie
1958: Lux Playhouse (TV Series)
1958–1959: Cimarron City (TV Series) as Beth Purcell (Recurring role, 21 episodes)
1957–1959: The Red Skelton Hour (TV Series) as Clara Appleby / Nancy Lump Lump
1959: Hawaiian Eye (TV Series) as Martha Gregory
1960: The Lineup (TV Series) as Mary
1960: The Ann Sothern Show (TV Series) as Lil
1960: The Loretta Young Show (TV Series) as Mrs. Page
1961: My Darling Judge (TV Movie)
1954–1961: General Electric Theater (TV Series) as Betsy Dunn / Olga Lemaire / Mary Lund / Ellen
1960–1961: Alfred Hitchcock Presents (TV Series) as Mrs. Philips / Betsy Blake
1962: Route 66 (TV Series) as Babe Hunter
1962: Rawhide (TV Series) as Vada Nordquist
1962–1963: Our Man Higgins (TV Series) as Alice MacRoberts (Recurring role, 34 episodes)
1964: Kraft Suspense Theatre (TV Series) as Mrs. Myra Moran
1964: The Carpetbaggers as Prostitute
1964 Perry Mason (TV Series) as Reba Burgess
1965: Harlow as Marilyn
1965–1966: Dr. Kildare (TV Series) as Ella Vitnack / Norma Littell
1966: Bonanza (TV Series) as Beth Riley
1967: Chubasco as Theresa
1967: The Outsider (starring Darren McGavin) as Mrs. Bishop
1968: Run for Your Life (TV Series) as Dorothy Young
1969: Ironside (TV Series) as Norma Baum
1967–1969: The Virginian (TV Series) as Audry / Mrs. Archer
1970: The Bold Ones: The Lawyers (TV Series) as Edith Powell
1970: Insight (TV Series) as Mrs. Goddard
1973: Hawaii Five-O (TV Series) as Mrs. Royce
1975: Harry O (TV Series) as  Mrs. Dante
1975: Police Story (TV Series) as Judge
1976: Matt Helm (TV Series) as Mrs. Simmons / Ellen's mom
1969–1976: Medical Center (TV Series) as Nurse Eve Wilcox
1978: The Nativity (TV Movie) as Elizabeth
1979: The Apple Dumpling Gang Rides Again as Martha Osten - Blind Cabin Widow
1980: The Great Cash Giveaway Getaway (TV Movie)  as Judge
1984: City Killer (TV Movie)  as Receptionist
1987: Murder, She Wrote (TV Series) as Sister Paul (final appearance)

References

Actress filmographies
American filmographies